Dione Angela Grimston, Countess of Verulam,  (née Smith; born 19 July 1954) is a British artist and former Lord Lieutenant of Hertfordshire.

The daughter of Jeremy Smith and Julia Burrell, she is maternally granddaughter of Sir Walter Burrell, 8th Baronet. She married John Grimston, 7th Earl of Verulam, on 12 September 1976. Lord and Lady Verulam have four children:

James Grimston, Viscount Grimston (b. 6 January 1978)
Hon. Hugo Guy Sylvester Grimston (b. 5 November 1979)
Hon. Sam George Grimston (b. 18 October 1983)
Lady Flora Grimston (b. 28 September 1981)

The Countess of Verulam served as High Sheriff of Hertfordshire in 2002 and was appointed Lord Lieutenant of Hertfordshire in June 2007 following the retirement of Sir Simon Bowes-Lyon. She served until July 2017 and was the first woman to hold that office. She was succeeded by Robert Voss. She was appointed Commander of the Royal Victorian Order (CVO) in the 2019 Birthday Honours.

Lady Verulam has worked on churches, Cliveden Hall and Hambleton Hall, and has exhibited her paintings in London. She is the patron of Home-Start St Albans. A keen artist, Lady Verulam specialises in collages and has her works exhibited in collections across the UK, America, Switzerland and Spain.

References

External links
 
 

1954 births
Living people
British countesses
Lord-Lieutenants of Hertfordshire
High Sheriffs of Hertfordshire
20th-century English painters
21st-century English painters
English printmakers
Dione
20th-century British printmakers
Dione
Commanders of the Royal Victorian Order